ZOOM is an Israeli kids cable television channel. It launched on December 2, 2012 (HOT) and launched on June 3, 2013 (Yes). It is owned by Imagine Media.

Current Series

Original series

Live Action Comedy
 Amile (August 25, 2013 – present) (HOT only)
 The Geeks Club (February 16, 2014 – present) (HOT only)
 Tzafuf (2017 – present) (HOT only)

Sketch Comedy
 Shevet Tzotzelet (October 5, 2014 – present) (Yes only)

Variety programs
 The Slow and The Furious (February 16, 2014 – present) 
 Hip Hop Break (August 5, 2014 – present)

Live Action
 Rosh Gadol (August 25, 2013 - January 16, 2014) (yes only) (April 8, 2015 – present) (both yes and HOT) 
 Deadtime Stories (August 1, 2014 – present)
Chica Vampiro (February 21, 2016)
 Wild Horses (February 1, 2016)
 The Hardy Boys (February 23, 2022 – present)
 All That (February 23, 2022 – present)
 The Astronauts (February 23, 2022 – present)
 The Barbarian and the Troll (February 23, 2022 – present)
 Goldie's Oldies (April 30, 2022 – present) 
 Creeped Out (February 6, 2023 – present)

Animated Series 
 The Day My Butt Went Psycho! (March 17, 2014 – present) 
 Get Ace (October 26, 2014 – present) 
 Tromba Trem (December 21, 2014 – present) 
 Buzz Bumble (March 4, 2015 – present) 
 Jar Dwellers SOS (May 25, 2015 – present) 
 Digimon Frontier (August 30, 2015 – present)
 Lanfeust Quest (October 11, 2015 – present) 
 Legends of Chima (November 1, 2015 – present)
 Regal Academy (2017–present)
 Glitter Force (2017–present)
 World of Winx (2017–present)
 Cupcake & Dino: General Services (2018–present)
 Tuca & Bertie (2019–present)
 Pokémon
 100% Wolf: Legend of the Moonstone (2021–present)
 Lego City Adventures (2022–present)
 Tig n' Seek (October 1, 2022–present)

Reruns

Live Action
 HaShir Shelanu High School (July 12, 2013 – present) (yes only) 
 Power Rangers S.P.D. (November 6, 2013 – present) 
 Power Rangers Ninja Storm (March 29, 2015 – present)

Former Series

Live Action
 Power Rangers Jungle Fury (December 2, 2012 – February 23, 2022)
 Power Rangers RPM (December 2, 2012 – February 23, 2022) 
 Splatalot! (December 2, 2012 – February 23, 2022) 
 Split (December 2, 2012 - January 31, 2013, March 16, 2014 – February 23, 2022) (HOT only) 
 The Aquabats! Super Show! (December 2, 2012 - August 26, 2013) 
 Lightning Point (December 2, 2012 - January 6, 2013) 
 Really Me (December 2, 2012 - January 6, 2013)  
 Power Rangers Operation Overdrive (January 28, 2013 – October 1, 2022) 
 Power Rangers Mystic Force (February 26, 2013 – October 1, 2022) 
 Power Rangers Dino Thunder (June 3, 2013 – October 1, 2022)  
 Journey to Fearless (June 28, 2013 - June 30, 2013) 
 Alien Dawn (August 11, 2013 - October 21, 2013, January 28, 2014 - March 4, 2014) 
 Ha-Comedy Store (October 27, 2013 - February 26, 2014) 
 Crazy Hidden Camera (January 26, 2014 - 2 March 2014)

Animated
 Spliced (December 2, 2012 – February 23, 2022) 
 Detentionaire (December 2, 2012 – February 23, 2022) (seasons 1-2. It is unknown if season 3 will air) 
 Iron Man: Armored Adventures (December 2, 2012 – July 22, 2022) 
 Fantastic Four: World's Greatest Heroes (December 2, 2012 - June 30, 2013, August 6, 2013 - September 12, 2013) 
 Rescue Heroes (December 2, 2012 - August 26, 2013) 
 Zorro: Generation Z (January 7, 2013 - June 30, 2013) 
 Supa Strikas (January 22, 2013 – February 6, 2023) 
 Oh No! It's an Alien Invasion (January 28, 2013 – July 22, 2022)
 The Gees (February 6, 2013 – October 1, 2022) 
 Wizards vs Aliens (February 20, 2013 – July 22, 2022) 
 The Smurfs (April 16, 2013 - March 1, 2015) 
 Bratz (May 3, 2013 – February 6, 2023)
 One Minute Before (May 6, 2013 - June 30, 2013, January 5, 2014 - February 10, 2014) 
 G.I. Joe: Renegades (June 2, 2013 - August 5, 2013, December 11, 2013 - January 2, 2014) 
 Kaijudo (June 2, 2013 - June 23, 2014) 
 Transformers: Rescue Bots (June 6, 2013 – July 22, 2022)
 Action Dad (July 1, 2013 - August 5, 2013, November 14, 2013 - November 27, 2013, February 2, 2014 - February 13, 2014)  
 Digimon Adventure (August 25, 2013 - November 14, 2013, December 22, 2013 - January 27, 2014)
 Grojband (August 26, 2013 - April 22, 2014) 
 Strange Hill High (August 26, 2013 - October 27, 2013, January 21, 2014 - February 13, 2014) 
 Wendy (September 15, 2013 - October 20, 2013) 
 Digimon Adventure 02 (November 17, 2013 - December 19, 2013) 
 The Trash Pack (November 28, 2013 - December 5, 2013) 
 Secret Millionaires Club (November 28, 2013 - April 24, 2014) 
 Digimon Data Squad (February 16, 2014 - June 16, 2014) 
 The Mysterious Cities of Gold (2012) (July 1, 2014 - August 5, 2014) 
 Digimon Fusion (November 16, 2014 – April 29, 2022) (season 2 is coming soon)
 Digimon Tamers (March 23, 2015 - June 1, 2015)

Specials
 One Direction: This Is Us (October 31, 2013) 
 Stan Lee's Mighty 7: Beginnings (February 20, 2015)

Movies (as part of the "I Want a Movie" block)

Animated
 Alpha and Omega 
 Arthur and the Invisibles 
 Arthur and the Revenge of Maltazard 
 Arthur 3: The War of the Two Worlds 
 Donkey Xote 
 El Ratón Pérez
 Everyone's Hero 
 Fly Me to the Moon
 Tristan et Iseut 
 Romeo & Juliet: Sealed with a Kiss
 Epic
 Turbo
 Trolls
 Storks

Programming Blocks
 ZOOM in the morning - The block aired in summer 2013 on weekday mornings and featured new episodes of Spliced, Bratz (two episodes in a row), The Smurfs (two episodes in a row), Action Dad, Supa Strikas, Transformers: Rescue Bots, Kaijudo, G.I. Joe: Renegades, Iron Man: Armored Adventures, Power Rangers Mystic Force and Splatalot!.
 ZOOM's Action Heroes - The block airs on weekday afternoons and features new episodes of Power Rangers Dino Thunder, Iron Man: Armored Adventures, Supa Strikas, Zorro: Generation Z, Kaijudo, G.I. Joe: Renegades and Transformers: Rescue Bots.
 ZOOM On Whatever You Want - The block airs every Saturday morning and features a marathon of a random series that the viewers pick at ZOOM's Facebook page.
 I Want A Movie - The block airs every Saturday morning and features a movie.

External links
Official Site
ZOOM's section on Hot's site

Television channels in Israel
Children's television networks